Daniel Whitehouse (born 12 January 1995) is a British cyclist, who most recently rode for UCI Continental team . He has also competed for New Zealand during his career, having received his education at Christchurch Boys' High School and lived in Christchurch, New Zealand.

Major results

2014
 4th Overall New Zealand Cycle Classic
2015
 3rd Overall Tour de Ijen
2016
 1st  Overall Tour de Flores
1st Stage 2
 4th Overall Tour of Japan
1st  Young rider classification
 4th Overall Tour de Ijen
2017
 2nd Overall Tour de Filipinas
1st  Young rider classification
1st Stage 1
 2nd Overall Tour de Singkarak
1st Stage 2
 6th Overall Tour de Flores
1st Stage 5
2018
 1st Le Race
 1st  Mountains classification, Vuelta a Castilla y León
 2nd Overall Tour de Beauce
 5th Overall Tour de Indonesia
2019
 1st Le Race (course record)
 4th Overall New Zealand Cycle Classic

References

External links

1995 births
Living people
New Zealand male cyclists
British male cyclists
People educated at Christchurch Boys' High School
Sportspeople from Christchurch